The Granollers Half Marathon (Catalan: Mitja Marató de Granollers) is an annual road running competition over the half marathon distance (21.097 km) which takes place in February in the city of Granollers in Catalonia, Spain.

The race is organised by the Col·lectiu d'Atletes de Fons group and was first held in 1987. The course starts and finishes in Granollers and passes through Les Franqueses del Vallès and La Garriga. It is among the more popular half marathon events in Spain with around 10,000 runners taking part in the day's events.. In addition to the main half marathon race, there are two further events: a 5 km race for fun runners and "the mini", which hosts a range of short distances for children.

In its early editions the race attracted a principally Spanish audience. The first African winner was Ezequiel Bitok in 1993 and his course record run of 1:01:48 hours marked the introduction of elite-level participation at the event. Alberto Juzdado became the first Spaniard to complete the course in under one hour and two minutes in 1998. In 2000, Esther Kiplagat of Kenya was the first foreign female to win at the event and she improved the course record by over two minutes. Two consecutive wins by marathon world record holder Haile Gebrselassie in 2005/2006 brought a Spanish all-comers record time of 60:08 minutes and further recognition of the race's elite level status, as did 10,000 m world champion Gete Wami's course record time of 1:10:24.2 hours in the women's race. The 2004 Olympic marathon champion Stefano Baldini and two-time European champion Marta Domínguez won the men's and women's races in 2007.

Kenya's Samuel Wanjiru became the first man to run a sub-60-minute half marathon in Spain at the 2008 Granollers race: his time of 59:26 minutes was the fourth fastest time in the world that year. Both Wanjiru and Domínguez claimed their second Granollers titles the year afterwards. In 2012, Catalonia's Carles Castillejo became the first Spanish male winner since 1999 by defeating world record holder Patrick Makau.

Past winners

Key:

References

List of winners
Civai, Franco & Vázquez, Gerardo (2012-02-06). Granollers Half Marathon. Association of Road Racing Statisticians. Retrieved on 2012-02-12.

External links
Official website

Half marathons
Marathons in Spain
Athletics competitions in Catalonia
Recurring sporting events established in 1987
1987 establishments in Spain
Winter events in Spain
Granollers